St Martin's is the Roman Catholic Church in Brackley.
It is in the joint Parish of Buckingham and Brackley,
together with St Bernardine's Catholic Church, Buckingham.

External links
 St Martin's Catholic Church, Brackley

Roman Catholic churches in Northamptonshire
Brackley